Tunnelblick is a free, open source graphic user interface for OpenVPN, a Virtual Private Network (VPN), on OS X and macOS. It provides easy control of OpenVPN client and/or server connections.

History 
The first stable release was version 3.0 in March 2010.

Issues 
In January 2016, the Sparkle Updater component used by Tunnelblick was found to be vulnerable to a man-in-the-middle attack. This security flaw has since been patched.

Any VPN or third party tool like Tunnelblick can cause connectivity problems while syncing with iCloud.

References

External links 
 Official website
 GitHub page

Utilities for macOS